The list below includes women of color who identify as feminist, including intersectional, Black, Chicana, and Mexican feminism.

References

Women of color
Lists of women